The Blood of Jesus (also known as The Glory Road) is a 1941 American fantasy drama race film written, directed by and starring Spencer Williams. The plot concerns a Baptist woman who, after being accidentally shot by her atheist husband, is sent to a crossroads, where Satan tries to lead her astray.

The film was very successful and, in 1991, was selected for preservation in the National Film Registry by the Library of Congress, being deemed "culturally, historically, or aesthetically significant".

Plot
In a small rural village with an African American population, a church group is holding a riverside baptismal service, and one of the faithful being immersed is the recently married Martha (Cathryn Caviness). However, Martha's husband Ras (Spencer Williams) is absent from the service – he claims he was hunting, but he actually poached a neighbor's boar. At home, Ras accidentally shoots Martha when his rifle drops on the floor and discharges. The church congregation gathers at Martha's bedside to pray for her recovery, and during this period an angel (Rogenia Goldthwaite) arrives to take Martha's spirit from her body. She is brought to the Crossroads between Heaven and Hell, and initially she is tempted by the slick Judas Green (Frank H. McClennan), who is an agent for Satan (James B. Jones). Judas takes Martha to a nightclub, where the floor show includes an acrobat and a jazz singer. Judas arranges to have Martha employed by the roadhouse owner Rufus Brown, but the angel returns and advises Martha to flee. As she is escaping, a nightclub patron mistakenly believes Martha is a pickpocket who robbed him. A chase ensues and Martha races back to the Crossroads between Hell and Zion, where Satan (along with a jazz band on a flatbed truck) is waiting for her arrival. The voice of Jesus Christ challenges the mob who go away. The sign at the Crossroad is transformed into the vision of Jesus Christ being crucified, and Christ's blood drips down on Martha's face. She awakens to discover she is home and her health is restored. Martha is reunited with her husband, who has now embraced religion. The angel who took Martha on her journey returns to bless the marriage.

Cast
*Cathryn Caviness as Sister Martha Ann Jackson
Spencer Williams as Ras Jackson
Juanita Riley as Sister Jenkins
Reather Hardeman as Sister Ellerby
Rogenia Goldthwaite as The Angel
James B. Jones as Satan
Frank H. McClennan as Judas Green
Eddie DeBase as Rufus Brown
Alva Fuller as Luke Williams
Samuel Lee Ellison Jr as Gambler

Production
The Blood of Jesus was the second film directed by Spencer Williams, who was one of the few African American directors active in the 1940s. The Blood of Jesus was produced in Texas on a budget of US$5,000. To present the afterlife, Williams used scenes from a 1911 Italian film called L'Inferno that depicted souls entering Heaven. In addition to Williams, the cast was made up of amateur actors and members of Reverend R. L. Robinson's Heavenly Choir, who sang the film's gospel music score.

Music
The film's soundtrack includes a variety of spirituals and hymns. All songs arranged by Henry Thacker Burleigh, unless otherwise noted, and performed by R.L. Robertson and The Heavenly Choir.

"Good News" (Traditional)
"Go Down Moses" (Traditional)
"Heav'n, Heav'n" (Traditional)
"On Jordan's Stormy Banks I Stand" (Music: M. Durham; Lyrics: Samuel Stennet)
"Amazing Grace" (Music: Traditional, arranged: William Walker; lyrics: John Newton)
"Run, Child, Run" (Traditional spiritual)
"Were You There (When They Crucified My Lord)" (Traditional)
"Swing Low, Sweet Chariot" (Writer: Wallis Willis)
"Old Time Religion" (Traditional spiritual)
"I've Heard of a City Called Heaven" (Spiritual)
"Weary Blues" (Music: Artie Matthews) – Gussie Smith.

Release and legacy
The Blood of Jesus was screened in cinemas and in black churches. The film's commercial success enabled Williams to direct and write additional feature films for Sack Amusement Enterprises, including two films with religious themes: Brother Martin: Servant of Jesus (1942) and Go Down Death (1944).

For years, The Blood of Jesus was considered a lost film until prints were discovered in the mid-1980s in a warehouse in Tyler, Texas.

Critical appraisal of The Blood of Jesus has been positive, with Dave Kehr of The New York Times calling the film “magnificent” and J. Hoberman of The Village Voice stating it is “a masterpiece of folk cinema that has scarcely lost its power to astonish.” Time magazine counted it among its “25 Most Important Films on Race.” Historian Thomas Cripps, in his book Black Film as Genre, praised The Blood of Jesus for providing “a brief anatomy of Southern Baptist folk theology by presenting Christian myth in literal terms. From its opening voiceover, the film became an advocate for the most enduring traditions of Afro-American family life on Southern ground.”

Filmmaker Julie Dash cited the baptismal sequence in The Blood of Jesus as the inspiration for a similar scene from her 1991 feature film Daughters of the Dust. In 1991, The Blood of Jesus became the first race film to be added to the U.S. National Film Registry.

See also
 List of films in the public domain in the United States

Notes

External links
The Blood of Jesus essay by Mark S. Giles  at National Film Registry 
The Blood of Jesus essay by Daniel Eagan in America's Film Legacy: The Authoritative Guide to the Landmark Movies in the National Film Registry, A&C Black, 2010 , pages 330-332 

 
 
 
 

1941 films
American black-and-white films
1940s English-language films
United States National Film Registry films
Films directed by Spencer Williams
Race films
Films about Christianity
Films based on poems
The Devil in film
African-American films